Chathura Milan (born 7 August 1998) is a Sri Lankan cricketer. He made his Twenty20 debut for Sri Lanka Ports Authority Cricket Club in the 2017–18 SLC Twenty20 Tournament on 1 March 2018. He made his List A debut for Sri Lanka Ports Authority Cricket Club in the 2017–18 Premier Limited Overs Tournament on 18 March 2018.

References

External links
 

1998 births
Living people
Sri Lankan cricketers
Sri Lanka Ports Authority Cricket Club cricketers
Place of birth missing (living people)